William J. Driver (May 9, 1918 – June 25, 1985) was an American administrator who served as the Administrator of Veterans Affairs from 1965 to 1969 and as Commissioner of the Social Security Administration from 1980 to 1981.

He died of kidney failure on June 25, 1985, in Arlington County, Virginia at age 67.

References

External links

|-

1918 births
1985 deaths
Carter administration personnel
Commissioners of the Social Security Administration
Deaths from kidney failure
Lyndon B. Johnson administration personnel
Nixon administration personnel
United States Department of Veterans Affairs officials